Zacharias Traber (1611–1678) was an Austrian Jesuit. He dedicated himself to studies on optics.

Works

References

External links
 Zacharias Traber (1675) Nervus opticus sive tractatus theoricus - digital facsimile from the Linda Hall Library

Optical physicists
17th-century Jesuits
1611 births
1678 deaths